Windham High Peak is a mountain located in Greene County, New York. 
The mountain is part of the Catskill Mountains.

Windham High Peak stands within the watershed of the Hudson River, which drains into New York Bay.
The south and northwest sides of Windham drain into Batavia Kill, and thence into Schoharie Creek, the Mohawk River, and the Hudson River.
The northeast side of Windham drains into Bowery Creek, thence into Catskill Creek, and the Hudson River.

Windham High Peak is within New York's Catskill Park.

See also 
 List of mountains in New York
 Catskill High Peaks
 Catskill Mountain 3500 Club

References

External links 
 Windham High Peak Hiking Info Catskill 3500 Club
 

Mountains of Greene County, New York
Catskill High Peaks
Mountains of New York (state)